Walter Henry Brierley (1862–1926) was a York architect who
practised in the city for 40 years. He is known as "the Yorkshire Lutyens" or the "Lutyens of the North".
He is also credited with being a leading exponent of the "Wrenaissance" style - incorporating elements of Christopher Wren.

Brierley's works include civic buildings, churches, schools and private houses (including his own home, Bishopsbarns) and are located mainly in York, North Yorkshire and the north of England. He was responsible for over 300 buildings between 1885 and the time of his death in 1926. He was the architect for the York Diocese.

The Borthwick Institute in York holds an archive of the Atkinson Brierley architectural practice, a practice that lives on as Brierley Groom, the oldest architectural firm in the UK having continuously practised since 1750. In 2013 Pocklington School unveiled a clock based on plans drawn up by Brierley 116 years earlier and found at the Borthwick in 2006.

A celebration of Brierley's life and architecture in 2007 unearthed the fact that he had designed and built many of the houses and other buildings (such as the Church of St Mary) in Goathland. Simon Groom, current co-owner of architects Brierley Groom, noted that the opening credits of the popular ITV programme Heartbeat displayed large amounts of Brierley's work on screen.

Brierley buildings

The "List Entry" number is a unique number assigned to each listed building and scheduled monument by Historic England (This is left blank if the building is not listed)

References

See also
 Exhibition celebrating 60 years of York Civic Trust 
 P. Nuttgens, Brierley in Yorkshire: The Architecture of the Turn of the Century (York Georgian Society, 1984)

People from York
1862 births
1926 deaths
Architects from Yorkshire